Ceromya lutea is a species of tachinid flies in the genus Ceromya of the family Tachinidae.

External links

Tachininae